Herring is an unincorporated community in Preston County, West Virginia, United States.

Notes

Unincorporated communities in Preston County, West Virginia
Unincorporated communities in West Virginia